The Las Vegas Philharmonic is an American symphony orchestra, based in Las Vegas, Nevada. It was founded in 1998 by Music Director and Conductor Laureate Harold Leighton Weller and long-time Las Vegas arts supporters Susan Tompkins and Andrew Tompkins.

Since October 2012, the Las Vegas Philharmonic has been based at the Smith Center for the Performing Arts. Before then, it was based at Artemus W. Ham Concert Hall on the campus of the University of Nevada, Las Vegas.  Nine guest conductors led the orchestra through the 2012-2013 season, each auditioning for the position of principal conductor. Las Vegas Philharmonic is sometimes referred to as Las Vegas Philharmonic Orchestra.

Principal conductors
 1998–2007 Harold Leighton Weller
 2007-2014  David Itkin
 2014–present Donato Cabrera

External links
 Official website

References

Musical groups established in 1998
Wikipedia requested audio of orchestras
Performing arts in Nevada
Musical groups from Nevada
American orchestras
Las Vegas shows